The San Antonio Rose Palace is a 4,500-seat multi-purpose arena in the Leon Springs area of San Antonio, Texas. It hosts local sporting events, rodeos, and concerts.

History 
San Antonio lawyer Wayne Crocker originally constructed the complex in 1982 as the Silver Rose Garden. In 1984, it was renamed by a new owner to The San Antonio Rose Palace and later to the Twin Oaks Exposition Center.

Investor Michael Hopkins purchased the equestrian center from the Resolution Trust Corporation in 1992, which was liquidating assets of First State Savings, an insolvent San Antonio savings and loan association. He began renovations on the facility and restored the previous San Antonio Rose Palace name.

In 1998, a group of investors led by country singer George Strait purchased the facility. The Rose Palace was put up for sale in 2018 and temporarily closed. In March 2019, the arena announced plans to re-open under new management, but still owned by Strait.

Events 
The Rose Palace hosted the San Antonio Steers of the National Indoor Football League.

References

External links 

Indoor arenas in Texas
Sports venues in San Antonio
American football venues in Texas
Rodeo venues in the United States
1982 establishments in Texas
Sports venues completed in 1982